The 2021 Horizon League softball tournament is being held at the YSU Softball Complex on the campus of Youngstown State University in Youngstown, Ohio from May 13 through May 15, 2021. The tournament winner will earn the Horizon League's automatic bid to the 2021 NCAA Division I softball tournament

Tournament

Bracket

References

Horizon League softball tournament
Tournament
Horizon League softball tournament